Janis Antiste (born 18 August 2002) is a French professional footballer who plays as a forward for  club Amiens, on loan from Sassuolo.

Club career

Toulouse
On 13 October 2019, Antiste signed his first professional contract with Toulouse. He made his professional debut with the club in a 1–0 Ligue 1 loss to Strasbourg on 5 February 2020.

Spezia
On 25 August 2021, Antiste signed with Italian Serie A side Spezia Calcio.

Sassuolo
On 31 August 2022, Antiste joined Sassuolo on loan with an obligation to buy.

Amiens
On 29 January 2023, Antiste was loaned by Sassuolo to Amiens.

International career
A French international in youth teams, Antiste has seven selections for a goal with the under-16s between 2017 and 2018 and two selections with the under-17s in 2018.

In March 2021, he was called up for the first time to the France U19 team.

Personal life
Born in mainland France, Antiste is of Martiniquais Malagasy descent through his father.

References

External links
 
 

 Toulouse FC Profile

2002 births
Living people
French footballers
French people of Martiniquais descent
France youth international footballers
France under-21 international footballers
Association football forwards
Toulouse FC players
Spezia Calcio players
U.S. Sassuolo Calcio players
Amiens SC players
Ligue 1 players
Ligue 2 players
Championnat National 3 players
Serie A players
French expatriate footballers
Expatriate footballers in Italy
French expatriate sportspeople in Italy